A Christmas Horror Story is a 2015 Canadian anthology horror film directed by Grant Harvey, Steven Hoban, and Brett Sullivan. It premiered on July 20, 2015, at the Fantasia International Film Festival and had a limited theatrical release on October 2, 2015, along with a VOD release. The film is a series of interwoven stories tied together by a framework story featuring William Shatner as a radio DJ.

Plot
Dangerous Dan is an alcoholic radio DJ stuck pulling a long shift at the Bailey Downs radio station during Christmas. During his broadcast, he keeps receiving notices of a disturbance at the local mall, telling his listeners to stay away. Dan keeps playing his music while a series of four stories are witnessed:

First story
Dylan, Ben, and Molly Simon have decided to break into their school, which used to be a convent, to investigate the murders of two students, one of whom was Dan's grandson, that occurred in the school's basement the year before. Their friend, Caprice, was supposed to go, but she instead has to go with her parents out of town. The three of them end up getting locked in the basement. Molly becomes possessed after witnessing a bloody ghost and tries to seduce Dylan. When he refuses her, Molly kills him. Molly successfully seduces Ben and after the act is finished, the ghost leaves Molly's body. Upon waking, Molly reveals that the ghost was actually a pregnant teenager named Grace who died when the school was a convent after the nuns gave her a gruesome abortion. The ghost is only interested in having someone give birth to her child and if they refuse, they are murdered – explaining last year's deaths. Despite having successfully gotten Molly pregnant, the ghost sees Ben holding a weapon which is viewed as a threat, and the ghost kills him. The ghost then unlocks the door and allows Molly to leave.

Second story
Scott Peters is a police officer who worked the murder case of the two students the year before, but had to take a leave from the force due to the trauma of it. On Christmas Eve, much to his wife's reluctance, Scott convinces his family to go into woods owned by "Big Earl" to chop down a Christmas tree for their house. During the trek, Scott's son Will wanders off and gets lost. He and his wife Kim manage to find Will inside of a tree and are overjoyed to find him. This joy is short lived after Will begins to act strangely, culminating in Big Earl contacting the family to warn them that Will is actually a changeling. After the changeling kills Scott, Kim brings the changeling to Big Earl, who states that he's unable to help her find her son because it is up to the changelings. This ultimately ends with Kim shooting Big Earl, who was containing the changelings in the grove. Finally free, the changeling returns to his home and frees Will.

Third story
Caprice and her younger brother Duncan are traveling with their parents Taylor and Diane to visit their elderly Aunt Edda. During their visit, Edda tells them about the mythological creature Krampus, which frightens Caprice – especially after Duncan purposely destroys a Krampus figurine in an attempt to irritate Edda's caretaker, Gerhardt. Their parents decide to take the children home at Edda's insistence, but on the way they get into a car accident, forcing them to walk. Aware that they were being hunted by Krampus because they acted badly, the family members take refuge in a church where they attempt to confess their sins in belief that Krampus will leave them if they do so. However, they are picked off one by one until only Caprice remains. Caprice manages to flee to Aunt Edda's house. She is successful in killing Krampus who transforms into Gerhardt. It's revealed that he transformed into Krampus due to his anger over the family's actions and that Edda was fully aware that this would happen. Furious, Caprice's anger causes her to transform into Krampus, and she attacks Edda.

Fourth story
While preparing for a busy Christmas, Santa Claus discovers that all of his elves and his wife have turned into zombies after one of the infected elves dies following a fit of rage. He manages to kill them all, but is then forced to fight against Krampus. However, right when he's about to kill Krampus it's revealed that "Santa" is actually a Mall Santa named Norman, the weather forecaster on Dangerous Dan's radio show, who had a psychotic break while working overtime that caused him to see regular mall goers as zombies during the Christmas Food Drive. The police arrive and manage to gun him down just as he goes to kill "Krampus", revealed to be the mall's manager, Mr. Taylor.

This is the disturbance at the mall that Dangerous Dan has been mentioning through his broadcast.

Cast

Production
Directors for this film were Steven Hoban, who created the original idea, Grant Harvey (and Brett Sullivan, all of whom worked on the Ginger Snaps trilogy.

The sound track was created by Alex Khaskin, and consisted of spooky adaptations of traditional Christmas music. The film includes gory special effects.

Reception

Jake Dee from Arrow in the Head rated the film a 5/10, calling its overlapping segments "uneven", and stating that only the final two segments managed to be memorable. Brett Gallman from Oh, the Horror! offered similar criticism, stating that the film would have been better if its segments had played separately.

Not all reviews of the film, however were negative. Brad Miska from Bloody Disgusting gave the film a positive review, writing, "While A Christmas Horror Story doesn’t have the qualities of a big theatrical release, like Trick ‘r Treat, it’s glossy enough to bring joy to those however they end up seeing it." Jay Seaver from eFilmCritic gave the film 4/5 stars, calling it "a solidly-entertaining piece of work".

See also
 Krampus, a 2015 horror film that also features the Krampus folklore
 Silent Night, a 2012 horror film that is centered around Christmas
 Tales of Halloween, a 2015 horror anthology film that is also centered around a holiday
 Trick 'r Treat, a 2007 anthology horror film that is also centered around a holiday

References

External links

 
 

2015 films
2015 horror films
2010s ghost films
2010s Christmas horror films
2010s supernatural horror films
Canadian supernatural horror films
Canadian Christmas horror films
English-language Canadian films
Films about fairies and sprites
Canadian horror anthology films
Krampus in film
Canadian ghost films
Canadian zombie films
2010s English-language films
2010s Canadian films
Copperheart Entertainment films